Jason Chimera (born May 2, 1979) is a Canadian former professional ice hockey left winger who played for five teams in the National Hockey League (NHL).

Playing career
Chimera played his junior career in the WHL, for Medicine Hat and Brandon. He was selected 121st overall in the 1997 NHL Entry Draft by his hometown team, the Edmonton Oilers, mostly because of his outstanding skating. Chimera played three seasons on the Hamilton Bulldogs, which at that point was the Oilers' farm team  in the American Hockey League.  In his final season, he was named to the AHL First All-Star team.

Chimera played two seasons for Edmonton before being traded to the Phoenix Coyotes for draft choices.  Because of the NHL lockout, he did not play the following season and went to play in Italy for  Mastini Varese. Chimera was subsequently dealt to the Columbus Blue Jackets, without playing a game in Phoenix, as part of a trade for Geoff Sanderson.

With the Blue Jackets, Chimera predominantly played left wing on the team's third line. He was usually centered by Manny Malhotra and spent significant time playing alongside right wingers such as Dan Fritsche and Trevor Letowski. However, Chimera began the 2008–09 season as the veteran presence on a line with rookies Derick Brassard and Jakub Voracek.

He was a member of the 2007 Canadian IIHF World Championship team that won gold in a 4–2 win against Finland in Moscow.

Chimera was traded to the Washington Capitals on December 28, 2009 for Chris Clark and Milan Jurčina. Chimera was re-signed a two-year contract extension with the Capitals on September 29, 2011.

Chimera was re-signed a two-year contract extension with the Capitals on November 8, 2013.

On July 1, 2016, Chimera signed a two-year deal as a free agent with the New York Islanders. During the subsequent season, Chimera played in his 1,000th game.

In the 2017–18 season, his final season under contract with the Islanders, Chimera was dealt at the trade deadline to the Anaheim Ducks in exchange for Chris Wagner on February 26, 2018.

While with the Capitals, Chimera was nicknamed “the Ice Cheetah” for his speed on the ice.

Career statistics

Regular season and playoffs

International

References

External links 
 

1979 births
Living people
Anaheim Ducks players
Canadian people of Italian descent
Brandon Wheat Kings players
Canadian ice hockey left wingers
Columbus Blue Jackets players
Edmonton Oilers draft picks
Edmonton Oilers players
Hamilton Bulldogs (AHL) players
New York Islanders players
Piráti Chomutov players
Ice hockey people from Edmonton
Medicine Hat Tigers players
HC Varese players
Washington Capitals players
Canadian expatriate ice hockey players in the Czech Republic
Canadian expatriate ice hockey players in Italy
Canadian expatriate ice hockey players in the United States